Aada Paduchu is a 1967 Indian Telugu-language drama film, produced and directed by K. Hemambaradhara Rao under the Subhashini Art Pictures banner. It stars N. T. Rama Rao, Krishna Kumari, Sobhan Babu, Vanisri and Chandrakala, with music composed by T. Chalapathi Rao. The film is a remake of the 1952 Tamil movie En Thangai (1952) which was earlier remade in Hindi in 1959 as Chhoti Bahen and in Kannada in 1967 as Onde Balliya Hoogalu. The film received critical acclaim and was recorded as a Super Hit at the box office.

Plot
Satyam, a middle-class employee, leads a happy life along with his younger collegian brother Shekhar, as well a younger sister Sharada. He is in love with a school-teacher, Susheela, and both hope to get married after Sharada and Shekhar's marriages. Luck shines upon them and Sharada's marriage is arranged with Dr. Ramesh, while Shekhar decides to wed Lalitha, the only daughter of a wealthy man, Rao Bahadoor Ranga Rao. Satyam mortgages his house with his paternal uncle Dharmaiah. Then things turn sour after Sharada loses her vision in an accident; the wedding gets canceled. Satyam decides to remain single to look after his sister and permits Shekhar and Lalitha to get married. The marriage takes place, and Lalitha moves in. Shortly thereafter misunderstandings crop up, and lead to arguments, with Shekhar and Lalitha leaving the house. Then Satyam is fired from his job, Dharmaiah takes over the house, and asks him to leave. Homeless, they turn to Shekhar for help, but he refuses to assist them in any way. Then Satyam falls ill and gets separated from his sister, while Shekhar takes to horse-racing and alcohol, and a path that will only lead to self-destruction.

Cast

Soundtrack

Music composed by T. Chalapathi Rao. Music released by HMV Audio Company.

Box office
The film ran for more than 100 days in five centers in Guntur, Vijayawada, Kakinada, Rajahmundry and Visakhapatnam.

Reception 
Sikaraju of Andhra Sachitra Vara Patrika praised the risk taken by the producers in making the movie. He wrote positively about the performance of the cast and the music composition. He critically praised N. T. Rama Rao for taking up a new role against the popular culture.

References

External links
 

1967 films
1960s Telugu-language films
Indian black-and-white films
Indian drama films
Telugu remakes of Tamil films
1967 drama films